Kelly McCrimmon (born October 13, 1960) is the General Manager of the Vegas Golden Knights.

Playing career
Kelly McCrimmon played for the Prince Albert Raiders of the SJHL before suiting up with the Wheat Kings for two seasons, winning his first championship there as a player in his rookie season. After his WHL career, he played hockey for the University of Michigan Wolverines for four seasons, and was named captain his final season.

Brandon Wheat Kings
He spent his first years of coaching Junior Hockey in the SJHL, starting with the North Battleford North Stars for two seasons, then one with the Lloydminster Lancers.

In 1988 he re-joined the Brandon Wheat Kings as an Assistant Coach, then later became the General Manager in 1989, as well as a few stints as head coach on the way replacing Doug Sauter and Kevin Maxwell respectively. In 1992, he became the minority owner of the Wheat Kings purchasing one-third of the franchise. In 2001, he became the sole owner of the franchise as he bought the remaining shares from Bob Cornell.

In 1995–96, he won his first championship as a WHL General Manager and his second championship with the Wheat Kings.

In 2004, he took over the coaching duties for the Brandon Wheat Kings. In his third stint as head coach of Brandon Wheat Kings, he made an appearance in the finals as head coach and general manager.

In 2011, he stepped down from his coaching duties handing them to former Ottawa Senators head coach Cory Clouston.

He returned to the bench in the 2013–14 season for the Wheat Kings for the next three seasons. During the 2014–15 season, he coached the Wheat Kings to the Western Hockey League finals losing to the Kelowna Rockets. The next season he was brought on as an assistant coach to Team Canada at the World Junior Championships in Helsinki, Finland. The Wheat Kings had a second stint at the finals that year winning the Ed Chynoweth Cup that year against the Seattle Thunderbirds in five games.

Vegas Golden Knights

After twenty-six seasons with the Brandon Wheat Kings, on August 2, 2016, McCrimmon was named the first-ever Assistant General Manager of the new NHL expansion team Vegas Golden Knights. This came after he turned down an offer from the Toronto Maple Leafs to join their front office.

As McCrimmon's first year as assistant general manager, the Vegas Golden Knights became the second expansion team since the St. Louis Blues to make the Stanley Cup Final.

On May 2, 2019, he was promoted to General Manager as former General Manager George McPhee took on the role as President.

On January 26, 2021, McCrimmon acted as Head Coach of the Vegas Golden Knights in a 5-4 shootout loss to the St. Louis Blues due to a COVID-19 outbreak within the Vegas Golden Knights coaching staff.

Awards and achievements
Ed Chynoweth Cup - 2016

Personal life

He is the younger brother of the late former NHL Defenseman Brad McCrimmon.
  
McCrimmon and his wife, Terri have two adult children, Chelsea and Mick.

Career statistics

Head coaching record

References

1960 births
Living people
National Hockey League general managers
Prince Albert Raiders (SJHL) players
Brandon Wheat Kings coaches
Ice hockey people from Saskatchewan
Vegas Golden Knights executives
Michigan Wolverines men's ice hockey players